Clean UP, Green UP is an initiative to increase awareness on environmentally friendly works done in Uttar Pradesh by the state government. Just like Swachh Bharat Abhiyan It covers initiatives pertaining to solar energy, ban on plastics, cycle tracks, conservation of forests and animals/birds, etc. Uttar Pradesh is in the Guinness Book of World Records for planting most number of saplings in one day, with the government distributing and planting 10,38,578 saplings in ten locations on November 7th, 2015 as part of the initiative.

References

External links 
 Essel Infraprojects Commissions 50 MW Solar Power Project in Jalaun, Uttar Pradesh
 M/s Usher Eco Power Ltd. - Environment Clearance
 Solar Power Policy 2013 - Uttar Pradesh

Eco-towns

Environment of Uttar Pradesh
Government schemes in Uttar Pradesh
Urban development in India
Rural development in India